Amartuvshin Bayaraa (born 26 December 1996) is a Mongolian judoka.

He is the bronze medallist of the 2017 Judo Grand Prix The Hague in the -60 kg category.

References

External links
 

1996 births
Living people
Mongolian male judoka